Robert Henry Scott  (28 January 1833 – 18 June 1916) was an Irish meteorologist, who was president of the Royal Meteorological Society.

He was educated at Rugby School and Trinity College Dublin, where he was elected a Scholar.

References

 SCOTT, Robert Henry, Who Was Who, A & C Black, 1920–2008; online edn, Oxford University Press, Dec 2007 accessed 11 Jan 2012

External links
 

1833 births
1916 deaths
Alumni of Trinity College Dublin
Fellows of the Royal Society
Irish meteorologists
People educated at Rugby School
Presidents of the Royal Meteorological Society
Scholars of Trinity College Dublin